Jones County Courthouse may refer to:

Jones County Courthouse (Georgia), Gray, Georgia
Jones County Courthouse (Iowa), Anamosa, Iowa
Jones County Courthouse (Mississippi), Ellisville, Mississippi, listed on the National Register of Historic Places (NRHP)
Jones County Courthouse (Texas), Anson, Texas, listed on the NRHP